The country of Brazil occupies roughly half of South America, bordering the Atlantic Ocean. Brazil is bordered by the countries of Argentina, Bolivia, Colombia, Guyana, Paraguay, Peru, Suriname, Uruguay, Venezuela, and France (overseas department of France, French Guiana).

Much of the climate is tropical, with the south being relatively temperate. The largest river in Brazil, the second longest in the world, is the Amazon.

Size and geographical location
Brazil occupies most of the eastern part of the South American continent and its geographic heartland, as well as various islands in the Atlantic Ocean. The only countries in the world that are larger are Russia, Canada, China, and the United States. It spans four time zones, the westernmost of which is equivalent to Eastern Standard Time in the United States. The time zone of the capital (Brasília) and of the most populated part of Brazil along the east coast (UTC-3) is two hours ahead of Eastern Standard Time. The Atlantic islands are in the easternmost time zone.

In the early 1970s, Brazil claimed a territorial sea extending  from the country's shores, including those of the islands.

On Brazil's east coast, the Atlantic coastline extends . In the west, in clockwise order from the south, Brazil has  of borders with Uruguay, Argentina, Paraguay, Bolivia, Peru, Colombia, Venezuela, Guyana, Suriname, and French Guiana (overseas department of France). The only South American countries with which Brazil does not share borders are Chile and Ecuador. A few short sections are in question, but there are no true major boundary controversies with any of the neighboring countries.

Brazil has six major ecosystems: the Amazon Basin, a tropical rainforest system; the Pantanal bordering Paraguay and Bolivia, a tropical wetland system; the Cerrado, a savanna system that covers much of the center of the country; the Caatinga or thorny scrubland habitat of the Northeast; the Atlantic Forest (Mata Atlântica) that extends along the entire coast from the Northeast to the South; and the Pampas or fertile lowland plains of the far South.

Geology, geomorphology and drainage 
Precambrian crystalline shields cover 36% of the territory, especially its central area. The dramatic granite sugarloaf mountains in the city of Rio de Janeiro are an example of the terrain of the Brazilian shield regions, where continental basement rock has been sculpted into towering domes and columns by tens of millions of years of erosion, untouched by mountain-building events.

The principal mountain ranges average elevations just under . The Serra do Mar Range hugs the Atlantic coast, and the Serra do Espinhaço Range, the largest in area, extends through the south-central part of the country. The highest mountains are in the Tumucumaque, Pacaraima, and Imeri ranges, among others, which traverse the northern border with the Guianas and Venezuela.

In addition to mountain ranges (about 0.5% of the country is above ), Brazil's Central Highlands include a vast central plateau (Planalto Central). The rest of the territory is made up primarily of sedimentary basins, the largest of which is drained by the Amazon and its tributaries. The coastal zone is noted for thousands of kilometers of tropical beaches interspersed with mangroves, lagoons, and dunes, as well as numerous coral reefs. A recent global remote sensing analysis also suggested that there were 5,389 km2 of tidal flats in Brazil, making it the 7th ranked country in terms of how much tidal flat occurs there.

The Parcel de Manuel Luís Marine State Park off the coast of Maranhão protects the largest coral reef in South America.

Brazil has one of the world's most extensive river systems, with eight major drainage basins, all of which drain into the Atlantic Ocean. Two of these basins—the Amazon and Tocantins-Araguaia account for more than half the total drainage area. The largest river system in Brazil is the Amazon, which originates in the Andes and receives tributaries from a basin that covers 45.7% of the country, principally the north and west. The main Amazon river system is the Amazonas-Solimões-Ucayali axis (the -long Ucayali is a Peruvian tributary), flowing from west to east. Through the Amazon Basin flows one-fifth of the world's fresh water. The major tributaries on the southern side are, from west to east, the Javari, Juruá, Purus (all three of which flow into the western section of the Amazon called the Solimões), Madeira, Tapajós, Xingu, and Tocantins. On the northern side, the largest tributaries are the Branco, Japurá, Jari, and Rio Negro. The above-mentioned tributaries carry more water than the Mississippi (its discharge is less than one-tenth that of the Amazon). The Amazon and some of its tributaries, called "white" rivers, bear rich sediments and hydrobiological elements. The black-white and clear rivers—such as the Negro, Tapajós, and Xingu—have clear (greenish) or dark water with few nutrients and little sediment.

Its basin covers 7.6% of the national territory. Only  of the lower river are navigable for oceangoing ships. The Paraná system covers 14.5% of the country. The Paraná flows south among the Río de la Plata Basin, reaching the Atlantic between Argentina and Uruguay.

Below their descent from the highlands, many of the tributaries of the Amazon are navigable. Upstream, they generally have rapids or waterfalls, and boats and barges also must face sandbars, trees, and other obstacles. The Amazon river system was the principal means of access until new roads became more important. Hydroelectric projects are Itaipu, in Paraná, with 12,600 MW; Tucuruí, in Pará, with 7,746 MW; and Paulo Afonso, in Bahia, with 3,986 MW.

Natural resources 
Natural resources include: bauxite, gold, iron ore, manganese, nickel, phosphates, platinum, tin, clay, rare earth elements, uranium, petroleum, hydropower and timber.

Rivers and lakes 

List of rivers of Brazil

According to organs of the Brazilian government there are 12 major hydrographic regions in Brazil. Seven of these are river basins named after their main rivers; the other five are groupings of various river basins in areas which have no dominant river.
7 Hydrographic Regions named after their dominant rivers:
 Amazonas
 Paraguai
 Paraná
 Parnaíba
 São Francisco
 Tocantins
 Uruguay
5 coastal Hydrographic Regions based on regional groupings of minor river basins (listed from north to south):
 Atlântico Nordeste Ocidental (Western North-east Atlantic)
 Atlântico Nordeste Oriental (Eastern North-east Atlantic)
 Atlântico Leste (Eastern Atlantic)
 Atlântico Sudeste (South-east Atlantic)
 Atlântico Sul (South Atlantic)

The Amazon River is the widest and second longest river (behind the Nile) in the world. This huge river drains the greater part of the world's rainforests. Another major river, the Paraná, has its source in Brazil. It forms the border of Paraguay and Argentina, then winds its way through Argentina and into the Atlantic Ocean, along the southern coast of Uruguay.

Soil and vegetation 

Brazil's tropical soils produce almost 210 million tons of grain crops per year, from about 70 million hectares of crops. The country also has the 5th largest arable land area in the world. Burning also is used traditionally to remove tall, dry, and nutrient-poor grass from pasture at the end of the dry season. Until mechanization and the use of chemical and genetic inputs increased during the agricultural intensification period of the 1970s and 1980s, coffee planting and farming, in general, moved constantly onward to new lands in the west and north. This pattern of horizontal or extensive expansion maintained low levels of technology and productivity and placed emphasis on quantity rather than the quality of agricultural production.

The largest areas of fertile soils, called terra roxa (red earth), are found in the states of Paraná and São Paulo. The least fertile areas are in the Amazon, where the dense rainforest is. Soils in the Northeast are often fertile, but they lack water, unless they are irrigated artificially.

In the 1980s, investments made possible the use of irrigation, especially in the Northeast Region and in Rio Grande do Sul State, which had shifted from grazing to soy and rice production in the 1970s. Savanna soils also were made usable for soybean farming through acidity correction, fertilization, plant breeding, and in some cases spray irrigation. As agriculture underwent modernization in the 1970s and 1980s, soil fertility became less important for agricultural production than factors related to capital investment, such as infrastructure, mechanization, use of chemical inputs, breeding, and proximity to markets. Consequently, the vigor of frontier expansion weakened.

The variety of climates, soils, and drainage conditions in Brazil is reflected in the range of its vegetation types. The Amazon Basin and the areas of heavy rainfall along the Atlantic coast have tropical rain forest composed of broadleaf evergreen trees. The rain forest may contain as many as 3,000 species of flora and fauna within a  area. The Atlantic Forest is reputed to have even greater biological diversity than the Amazon rain forest, which, despite apparent homogeneity, contains many types of vegetation, from high canopy forest to bamboo groves.

In the semiarid Northeast, caatinga, a dry, thick, thorny vegetation, predominates. Most of central Brazil is covered with a woodland savanna, known as the cerrado (sparse scrub trees and drought-resistant grasses), which became an area of agricultural development after the mid-1970s. In the South (Sul), needle-leaved pinewoods (Paraná pine or araucaria) cover the highlands; grassland similar to the Argentine pampa covers the sea-level plains. The Mato Grosso swamplands (Pantanal Mato-grossense) is a Florida-sized plain in the western portion of the Center-West (Centro-Oeste). It is covered with tall grasses, bushes, and widely dispersed trees similar to those of the cerrado and is partly submerged during the rainy season.

Brazil, which is named after reddish dyewood (pau brasil), has long been famous for the wealth of its tropical forests. These are not, however, as important to world markets as those of Asia and Africa, which started to reach depletion only in the 1980s. By 1996 more than 90% of the original Atlantic forest had been cleared, primarily for agriculture, with little use made of the wood, except for araucaria pine in Paraná.

The inverse situation existed with regard to clearing for wood in the Amazon rain forest, of which about 15% had been cleared by 1994, and part of the remainder had been disturbed by selective logging. Because the Amazon forest is highly heterogeneous, with hundreds of woody species per hectare, there is considerable distance between individual trees of economic value, such as mahogany and Pereira. Therefore, this type of forest is not normally cleared for timber extraction but logged through high-grading or selection of the most valuable trees. Because of vines, felling, and transportation, their removal causes destruction of many other trees, and the litter and new growth create a risk of forest fires, which are otherwise rare in rainforests. In favorable locations, such as Paragominas, in the northeastern part of Pará State, a new pattern of timber extraction has emerged: diversification and the production of plywood have led to the economic use of more than 100 tree species.

Starting in the late 1980s, rapid deforestation and extensive burning in Brazil received considerable international and national attention. Satellite images have helped document and quantify deforestation as well as fires, but their use also has generated considerable controversy because of problems of defining original vegetation, cloud cover, and dealing with secondary growth and because fires, as mentioned above, may occur in old pasture rather than signifying new clearing. Public policies intended to promote sustainable management of timber extraction, as well as sustainable use of nontimber forest products (such as rubber, Brazil nuts, fruits, seeds, oils, and vines), were being discussed intensely in the mid-1990s. However, implementing the principles of sustainable development, without irreversible damage to the environment, proved to be more challenging than establishing international agreements about them.

Climate

Although 90% of the country is within the tropical zone, the climate of Brazil varies considerably from the mostly tropical North (the equator traverses the mouth of the Amazon) to temperate zones below the Tropic of Capricorn (23°27' S latitude), which crosses the country at the latitude of the city of São Paulo. Brazil has five climatic regions: equatorial, tropical, semiarid, highland tropical, and subtropical.

There is little seasonal variation near the equator, although at times it can get cool enough for wearing a jacket, especially in the rain. At the country's other extreme, there are frosts south of the Tropic of Capricorn during the winter (June–August), and there is snow in the mountainous areas, such as Paraná, Rio Grande do Sul and Santa Catarina. The southern cities of Porto Alegre and Curitiba have a subtropical climate similar to that in parts of the United States and Europe, and temperatures can fall below freezing in winter.

Precipitation levels vary widely. Most of Brazil has moderate rainfall of between  a year, with most of the rain falling in the winter (between December and April) south of the Equator. It is less widely known that, despite high annual precipitation, the Amazon rain forest has a three- to five-month dry season, the timing of which varies according to location north or south of the equator.

High and relatively regular levels of precipitation in the Amazon contrast sharply with the dryness of the semiarid Northeast, where rainfall is scarce and there are severe droughts in cycles averaging seven years. The Northeast is the driest part of the country. The region also constitutes the hottest part of Brazil, where during the dry season between May and November, temperatures of more than  have been recorded. However, the sertão, a region of semidesert vegetation used primarily for low-density ranching, turns green when there is rain. Most of the Center-West has  of rain per year, with a pronounced dry season in the middle of the year, while the South and most of the year without a distinct dry season.

Geographic regions

Brazil's 26 states and the Federal District (Distrito Federal) are divided conventionally into five regions: North (Norte), Northeast (Nordeste), Southeast (Sudeste), South (Sul), and Center-West (Centro-Oeste). In 2015 there were 5,570 municipalities (municípios), which have municipal governments. Many municipalities, which are comparable to United States counties, are in turn divided into districts (distritos), which do not have political or administrative autonomy. In 2015 there were 10,424 districts. All municipal and district seats, regardless of size, are considered officially to be urban. For purely statistical purposes, the municipalities were grouped in 1990 into 558 micro-regions, which in turn constituted 137 meso-regions. This grouping modified the previous micro-regional division established in 1968, a division that was used to present census data for 1970, 1975, 1980, and 1985.

Each of the five major regions has a distinct ecosystem. Administrative boundaries do not necessarily coincide with ecological boundaries, however. In addition to differences in physical environment, patterns of economic activity and population settlement vary widely among the regions. The principal ecological characteristics of each of the five major regions, as well as their principal socioeconomic and demographic features, are summarized below.

Center-West 

The Center-West consists of the states of Goiás, Mato Grosso, Mato Grosso do Sul (separated from Mato Grosso in 1979) and the Federal District, where Brasília is located, the national capital. Until 1988 Goiás State included the area that then became the state of Tocantins in the North.

The Center-West has  and covers 18.9% of the national territory. Its main biome is the cerrado, the tropical savanna in which natural grassland is partly covered with twisted shrubs and small trees. The cerrado was used for low-density cattle-raising in the past but is now also used for soybean production. There are gallery forests along the rivers and streams and some larger areas of forest, most of which have been cleared for farming and livestock. In the north, the cerrado blends into tropical forest. It also includes the Pantanal wetlands in the west, known for their wildlife, especially aquatic birds and caimans. In the early 1980s, 33.6% of the region had been altered by anthropic activities, with a low of 9.3% in Mato Grosso and a high of 72.9% in Goiás (not including Tocantins). In 1996 the Center-West region had 10.2 million inhabitants, or 6% of Brazil's total population. The average density is low, with concentrations in and around the cities of Brasília, Goiânia, Campo Grande, and Cuiabá. Living standards are below the national average. In 1994 they were highest in the Federal District, with per capita income of US$7,089 (the highest in the nation), and lowest in Mato Grosso, with US$2,268.

Northeast 

The nine states that make up the Northeast are Alagoas, Bahia, Ceará, Maranhão, Paraíba, Pernambuco, Piauí, Rio Grande do Norte, and Sergipe. The Fernando de Noronha archipelago (formerly the federal territory of Fernando de Noronha, now part of Pernambuco state) is also included in the Northeast.

In 1994 Piauí had the lowest per capita income in the region and the country, only US$835, while Sergipe had the highest average income in the region, with US$1,958.

North 

The equatorial North, also known as the Amazon or Amazônia, includes, from west to east, the states of Rondônia, Acre, Amazonas, Roraima, Pará, Amapá, and, as of 1988, Tocantins (created from the northern part of Goiás State, which is situated in the Center-West). Rondônia, previously a federal territory, became a state in 1986. The former federal territories of Roraima and Amapá were raised to statehood in 1988.

With , the North is the country's largest region, covering 45.3% of the national territory. The region's principal biome is the humid tropical forest, also known as the rain forest, home to some of the planet's richest biological diversity. The North has served as a source of forest products ranging from "backlands drugs" (such as sarsaparilla, cocoa, cinnamon, and turtle butter) in the colonial period to rubber and Brazil nuts in more recent times. In the mid-twentieth century, nonforest products from mining, farming, and livestock-raising became more important, and in the 1980s the lumber industry boomed. In 1990, 6.6% of the region's territory was considered altered by anthropic (man-made) action, with state levels varying from 0.9% in Amapá to 14.0% in Rondônia.

In 1996 the North had 11.1 million inhabitants, only 7% of the national total. However, its share of Brazil's total had grown rapidly in the 1970s and early 1980s as a result of interregional migration, as well as high rates of natural increase. The largest population concentrations are in eastern Pará State and in Rondônia. The major cities are Belém and Santarém in Pará, and Manaus in Amazonas. Living standards are below the national average. The highest per capita income, US$2,888, in the region in 1994, was in Amazonas, while the lowest, US$901, was in Tocantins.

Southeast 

The Southeast consists of the four states of Espírito Santo, Minas Gerais, Rio de Janeiro, and São Paulo. Its total area of  corresponds to 10.9% of the national territory. The region has the largest share of the country's population, 63 million in 1991, or 39% of the national total, primarily as a result of internal migration since the mid-19th century until the 1980s. In addition to a dense urban network, it contains the megacities of São Paulo and Rio de Janeiro, which in 1991 had 18.7 million and 11.7 million inhabitants in their metropolitan areas, respectively. The region combines the highest living standards in Brazil with pockets of urban poverty. In 1994 São Paulo boasted an average income of US$4,666, while Minas Gerais reported only US$2,833.

Originally, the principal biome in the Southeast was the Atlantic Forest, but by 1990 less than 10% of the original forest cover remained as a result of clearing for farming, ranching, and charcoal making. Anthropic activity had altered 79.7% of the region, ranging from 75% in Minas Gerais to 91.1% in Espírito Santo. The region has most of Brazil's industrial production. The state of São Paulo alone accounts for half of the country's industries. Agriculture, also very strong, has diversified and now uses modern technology.

South 

The three states in the temperate South: Paraná, Rio Grande do Sul, and Santa Catarina—cover , or 6.8% of the national territory. The population of the South in 1991 was 23.1 million, or 14% of the country's total. The region is almost as densely settled as the Southeast, but the population is more concentrated along the coast. The major cities are Curitiba and Porto Alegre. The inhabitants of the South enjoy relatively high living standards. Because of its industry and agriculture, Paraná had the highest average income in 1994, US$3,674, while Santa Catarina, a land of small farmers and small industries, had slightly less, US$3,405.

In addition to the Atlantic Forest and Araucaria moist forests, much of which were cleared in the post-World War II period, the southernmost portion of Brazil contains the Uruguayan savanna, which extends into Argentina and Uruguay. In 1982, 83.5% of the region had been altered by anthropic activity, with the highest level (89.7%) in Rio Grande do Sul, and the lowest (66.7%) in Santa Catarina. Agriculture—much of which, such as rice production, is carried out by small farmers—has high levels of productivity. There are also some important industries.

Data 
Precambrian crystalline shields cover 36% of the territory, especially its central area. The dramatic granite sugarloaf mountains in the city of Rio de Janeiro are an example of the terrain of the Brazilian shield regions, where continental basement rock has been sculpted into towering domes and columns by tens of millions of years of erosion, untouched by mountain-building events.

The principal mountain ranges average elevations just under . The Serra do Mar Range hugs the Atlantic coast, and the Serra do Espinhaço Range, the largest in area, extends through the south-central part of the country. The highest mountains are in the Tumucumaque, Pacaraima, and Imeri ranges, among others, which traverse the northern border with the Guianas and Venezuela.

In addition to mountain ranges (about 0.5% of the country is above ), Brazil's Central Highlands include a vast central plateau (Planalto Central). The rest of the territory is made up primarily of sedimentary basins, the largest of which is drained by the Amazon and its tributaries. The coastal zone is noted for thousands of kilometers of tropical beaches interspersed with mangroves, lagoons, and dunes, as well as numerous coral reefs.

The Parcel de Manuel Luís Marine State Park off the coast of Maranhão protects the largest coral reef in South America.

Brazil has one of the world's most extensive river systems, with eight major drainage basins, all of which drain into the Atlantic Ocean. Two of these basins—the Amazon and Tocantins-Araguaia account for more than half the total drainage area. The largest river system in Brazil is the Amazon, which originates in the Andes and receives tributaries from a basin that covers 45.7% of the country, principally the north and west. The main Amazon river system is the Amazonas-Solimões-Ucayali axis (the -long Ucayali is a Peruvian tributary), flowing from west to east. Through the Amazon Basin flows one-fifth of the world's fresh water. The major tributaries on the southern side are, from west to east, the Javari, Juruá, Purus (all three of which flow into the western section of the Amazon called the Solimões), Madeira, Tapajós, Xingu, and Tocantins. On the northern side, the largest tributaries are the Branco, Japurá, Jari, and Rio Negro. The above-mentioned tributaries carry more water than the Mississippi (its discharge is less than one-tenth that of the Amazon). The Amazon and some of its tributaries, called "white" rivers, bear rich sediments and hydrobiological elements. The black-white and clear rivers—such as the Negro, Tapajós, and Xingu—have clear (greenish) or dark water with few nutrients and little sediment.

Its basin covers 7.6% of the national territory. Only  of the lower river are navigable for oceangoing ships. The Paraná system covers 14.5% of the country. The Paraná flows south among the Río de la Plata Basin, reaching the Atlantic between Argentina and Uruguay.

Below their descent from the highlands, many of the tributaries of the Amazon are navigable. Upstream, they generally have rapids or waterfalls, and boats and barges also must face sandbars, trees, and other obstacles. The Amazon river system was the principal means of access until new roads became more important. Hydroelectric projects are Itaipu, in Paraná, with 12,600 MW; Tucuruí, in Pará, with 7,746 MW; and Paulo Afonso, in Bahia, with 3,986 MW.

Natural resources include: bauxite, gold, iron ore, manganese, nickel, phosphates, platinum, tin, clay, rare earth elements, uranium, petroleum, hydropower and timber.

Locations
Brazil occupies most of the eastern part of the South American continent and its geographic heartland, as well as various islands in the Atlantic Ocean. The only countries in the world that are larger are Russia, Canada, China, and the United States. It spans four time zones, the westernmost of which is equivalent to Eastern Standard Time in the United States. The time zone of the capital (Brasília) and of the most populated part of Brazil along the east coast (UTC-3) is two hours ahead of Eastern Standard Time. The Atlantic islands are in the easternmost time zone.

In the early 1970s, Brazil claimed a territorial sea extending  from the country's shores, including those of the islands.

On Brazil's east coast, the Atlantic coastline extends . In the west, in clockwise order from the south, Brazil has  of borders with Uruguay, Argentina, Paraguay, Bolivia, Peru, Colombia, Venezuela, Guyana, Suriname, and French Guiana (overseas department of France). The only South American countries with which Brazil does not share borders are Chile and Ecuador. A few short sections are in question, but there are no true major boundary controversies with any of the neighboring countries.

References